Chantrapas is a 2010 Georgian drama film written and directed by Otar Iosseliani. The film was selected as the Georgian entry for the Best Foreign Language Film at the 84th Academy Awards, but it did not make the final shortlist.

Cast
 Dato Tarielachvili as Nicolas (as Dato Tarielashvili)
 Tamuna Karumidze as Barbara
 Fanny Gonin as Fanny
 Givi Sarchimelidze as Le grand-père
 Pierre Étaix as Le producteur français
 Bulle Ogier as Catherine
 Bogdan Stupka as L'ambassadeur
 Lasha Shevardnadze as Le mari de Barbara
 Nino Tchkheidze as La grand-mère
 Pascal Bonitzer as Un producteur
 Gela Katamadze as Nicolla

See also
 List of submissions to the 84th Academy Awards for Best Foreign Language Film
 List of Georgian submissions for the Academy Award for Best Foreign Language Film

References

External links
 

2010 films
2010 drama films
2010s Georgian-language films
2010s French-language films
Films directed by Otar Iosseliani
Drama films from Georgia (country)
2010 multilingual films
Multilingual films from Georgia (country)